The 2014 UMass Minutemen baseball team represents the University of Massachusetts Amherst in the 2014 NCAA Division I baseball season.  Mike Stone is in his 27th season as head coach.  The Minutemen play their home games at Earl Lorden Field.

2014 Roster

Schedule 

! style="background:#881c1c;color:#FFFFFF;"| Regular Season
|- 

|- align="center" bgcolor="#ffbbb"
| February 22 ||  || – || USA Baseball National Training Complex  || 0-14 || Dignacco(2-0)|| B. Walsh(0-1)|| None || 250 || 0-1 || –
|- align="center" bgcolor="#ffbbb"
| February 22 || Army || – || USA Baseball National Training Complex  || 3-4 || Larimer(1-0)|| R. Moloney(0-1)|| Griffith(1) || 274 || 0-2 || –
|- align="center" bgcolor="#ffbbb"
| February 23 || Army || – || USA Baseball National Training Complex  || 4-7 || Meadows(1-0) || LeBlanc, C(0-1) || None || 173 || 0-3 || –
|-

|- align="center" bgcolor="#ffbbb"
| March 1 || at Maryland || – || Shipley Field || 0-4 || Stinnett, J.(2-1) || LeBlanc, C(0-2) || None || - || 0-4 || –
|- align="center" bgcolor="#ffbbb"
| March 1 || at Maryland || – || Shipley Field || 1-10 || Shawaryn, M.(3-0) || Moloney, R(0-2) || None || 397 || 0-5 || –
|- align="center" bgcolor="#ffbbb"
| March 2 || at Maryland || – || Shipley Field || 2-3 || A. Robinson(1-0) || A. Plunkett(0-1) || None || 263 || 0-6 || –
|- align="center" bgcolor="#ffbbb"
| March 7 || at  || – || T. Henry Wilson, Jr. Field || 3-13 || Mooney(2-1) || R. Maloney(0-3)  || None || 111 || 0-7 || –
|- bgcolor="#ccffcc"
| March 8 ||  || – || T. Henry Wilson, Jr. Field || 15-0 || C. LeBlanc(1-2) || T. Boone(0-2) || None || 104 || 1-7 || –
|- align="center" bgcolor="#ffbbb"
| March 9 || at Davidson || – || T. Henry Wilson, Jr. Field || 8-9 || Neitzel(2-0) || A. Plunkett(0-2) ||  Saeta(3) || 132 || 1-8 || –
|- align="center" bgcolor="#ffbbb"
| March 15 || Army || – || Tampa, FL || 3-4 || J. Griffith(3-0) || B. Walsh(0-2) || None || 214 || 1-9 || –
|- align="center" bgcolor="#ffbbb"
| March 15 || Army || – || Tampa, FL || 4-9 || A. Robinett(1-2) || R. Maloney(0-4) || J. Larimer(1) || 214 || 1-10 || –
|- align="center" bgcolor="#ffbbb"
| March 16 || Army || – || Tampa, FL || 4-7 || G. Carroll(3-0) || M. Geannelis(0-1) || None || 201 || 1-11 || –
|- align="center" bgcolor="#ffbbb"
| March 19 || at   || – || Fiondella Field || 0-3 || Murphy || A. Grant(0-1) || Gouin(2) || 204 || 1-12 || –
|- bgcolor="#ccffcc"
| March 21 || La Salle* || – || Earl Lorden Field || 7-6 || D. Jauss(1-0) || O'Neill(0-5) || None || 217 || 2-12 || 1–0
|- bgcolor="#ccffcc"
| March 22 || La Salle* || – || Earl Lorden Field || 8-6 || B. Walsh(1-2) || Craig(0-1) || D. Jauss(1) || 157 || 3-12 || 2–0
|- align="center" bgcolor="#ffbbb"
| March 23 || La Salle* || – || Earl Lorden Field || 0-3 || O'Neill(1-5) || A. Plunkett(0-3) || Cherry(3) || 164 || 3-13 || 2–1
|- align="center" bgcolor="#ffbbb"
| March 28 || at * || – || Malcolm U. Pitt Field || 4-6 || de Marte(2-4) || C. LeBlanc(1-3) || Cook(4) || 121 || 3-14 || 2–2
|- align="center" bgcolor="#ffbbb"
| March 28 || at Richmond* || – || Malcolm U. Pitt Field || 1-10 || Sterling(3-1) || R. Moloney(0-5) || None || 117 || 3-15 || 2–3
|- align="center" bgcolor="#ffbbb"
| March 29 || at Richmond* || – || Malcolm U. Pitt Field || 5-8 || Harron(2-0) || M. Geannelis(0-2) || Martinson(2) || 212 || 3-16 || 2–4
|-

|- align="center" bgcolor="#ffbbb"
| April 2 || at  || – || John Shea Field || 6-7 || Skogsbergh(3-0) || D. Jauss(1-1) ||  Nicklas(2) || 264 || 3-17 || 2–4
|- align="center" bgcolor="#ffbbb"
| April 4 || * || – || Earl Lorden Field || 5-6 || LAHRMAN(2-1) || B. Walsh(1-3) || Harris(3) || 110 || 3-18 || 2–5
|- align="center" bgcolor="#ffbbb"
| April 5 || Dayton* || – || Earl Lorden Field || 2-6 || BUETTGEN(4-3) || A. Plunkett(0-4) || None || 150 || 3-19 || 2–6
|- bgcolor="#ccffcc"
| April 6 || Dayton* || – || Earl Lorden Field || 5-4 || D. Jauss(2-1) || WEYBRIGHT(1-3) || None || 210 || 4-19 || 3–6
|- bgcolor="#ccffcc"
| April 9 || || – || Earl Lorden Field || 5-3 || A. Grant(1-1) || Lippert(1-3) || T. McDonald(1) || 131 || 5-19 || 3–6
|- bgcolor="#ccffcc"
| April 11 || * || – || Earl Lorden Field || 7-1 || C. LeBlanc(2-3) || Bates(4-1) || None || 117 || 6-19 || 4–6
|- bgcolor="#ccffcc"
| April 12 || Saint Louis* || – || Earl Lorden Field || 3-2 || M. Geannelis(1-2) || Norwood(4-1) || None || 253 || 7-19 || 5–6
|- align="center" bgcolor="#ffbbb"
| April 13 || Saint Louis* || – || Earl Lorden Field || 1-2 || Eckelman(4-1) || R. Moloney(0-6) || None || 257 || 7-20 || 5–7
|- bgcolor="#ccffcc"
| April 18 || at * || – || Barcroft Park || 6-4 || M. Geannelis(2-2) || Milon(1-3) || B. Walsh(1) || 127 || 8-20 || 6–7
|- align="center" bgcolor="#ffbbb"
| April 19 || at George Washington* || – || Barcroft Park || 2-3 || Williams(4-3) || A. Plunkett(0-5) || Milon(6) || 224 || 8-21 || 6–8
|- align="center" bgcolor="#ffbbb"
| April 20 || at George Washington* || – || Barcroft Park || 4-5 || Muhl(2-0) || B. Walsh(2-3) || None || 247 || 8-22 || 6–9
|- align="center" bgcolor="#ffbbb"
| April 21 || at Harvard || – || Parsons Field || 0-3 || Coman(1-1) || R. Maloney(0-7) || Laurisch(1) || 190 || 8-23 || 6–9
|- align="center" bgcolor="#ffbbb"
| April 22 || Connecticut || – || Earl Lorden Field || 5-8 ||  Brown(1-0) || T. Cassidy(0-1) ||  Mahoney(4) || 123 || 8-24 || 6–9
|- align="center" bgcolor="#ffbbb"
| April 25 || at * || – || Houlihan Park || 5-10 || Porter(3-4) || M. Geannelis(2-3) || None || 177 || 8-25 || 6–10
|- align="center" bgcolor="#ffbbb"
| April 26 || at Fordhman* || – || Houlihan Park || 3-5 || Kennedy(4-6) || A. Plunkett(0-6) || Porter(2) || 186 || 8-26 || 6–11
|- bgcolor="#ccffcc"
| April 27 || at Fordham* || – || Houlihan Park || 4-1 || A. Grant(2-1) || Swatek(4-3) || None || 333 || 9-26 || 7–11
|- bgcolor="#ccffcc"
| April 29 || Connecticut || - || Earl Lorden Field || 5-4 || E. Mackintosh(1-0) || A. Zapata(3-2) || B. Walsh(2) || 110 || 10-26 || 7-11
|-

|- align="center" bgcolor="#ffbbb"
| May 2|| * || - || Earl Lorden Field || 7-12 || Montefusco(7-2) || C. LeBlanc(2-4) || Kalish(1) || 127 || 10-27 || 7-12
|- align="center" bgcolor="#ffbbb"
| May 3 || George Mason* || - || Earl Lorden Field || 0-7 || Gaynor(7-3) || A. Grant(2-2) || None || 156 || 10-28 || 7-13
|- bgcolor="#ccffcc"
| May 4 || George Mason* || - || Earl Lorden Field || 9-1 || B. Walsh(2-4) || Williams(3-2) || None || 111 || 11-28 || 8-13
|- bgcolor="#ccffcc"
| May 9 || VCU* || - || Earl Lorden Field || 5-4 || M. Geannelis(3-3) || Gill(3-4) || None || 93 || 12-28 || 9-13
|- align="center" bgcolor="#ffbbb"
| May 10 || VCU* || - || Earl Lorden Field || 6-10 || Dwyer(6-1) || T. McDonald(0-1) || None || 275 || 12-29 || 9-14
|- bgcolor="#ccffcc"
| May 11 || VCU* || - || Earl Lorden Field || 5-4 || M. Geannelis(4-3) || Lees(5-4) || None || 210 || 13-29 || 10-14
|- align="center" bgcolor=""
| May 1 || at * || - || Campbell's Field || - || - || - || - || - || - || -
|- align="center" bgcolor=""
| May 1 || at Saint Joseph's* || - || Campbell's Field || - || - || - || - || - || - || -
|- align="center" bgcolor=""
| May 1 || at Saint Joseph's* || - || Campbell's Field || - || - || - || - || - || - || -
|-

|-
| style="font-size:88%" | Rankings from USA TODAY/ESPN Top 25 coaches' baseball poll. Parenthesis indicate tournament seedings.
|-
| style="font-size:88%" | *Atlantic 10 Conference games
|-
| style="font-size:88%" | **Beanpot Challenge

References 

UMass
UMass Minutemen baseball seasons